The 1st Annual Interactive Achievement Awards is the 1st edition of the Interactive Achievement Awards, an annual awards event that honors the best games in the video game industry. The awards are arranged by the Academy of Interactive Arts & Sciences (AIAS), and were held during the first day of E3 1998 at the Georgia World Congress Center in Atlanta, Georgia. There was not an official host of the award ceremony.

Final Fantasy VII, GoldenEye 007, and Riven: The Sequel to Myst were tied for receiving the most nominations. GoldenEye 007 took home the most awards, including Interactive Title of the Year. Electronic Arts received the most nominations. Rare and Nintendo won the most awards, with Rare as the developer and Nintendo as the publisher. There was a tie between Age of Empires and StarCraft for Computer Strategy Game of the Year.

Shigeru Miyamoto was also the first inductee of the Academy of Interactive Arts & Sciences Hall of Fame.

Winners and Nominees
Winners are listed first, highlighted in boldface, and indicated with a double dagger.

Hall of Fame Award
 Shigeru Miyamoto

Games with multiple nominations and awards
Any game that was nominated for a console genre award was also a nominee for Console Game of the Year. The same can be applied to nominees for computer awards and Computer Game of the Year.

The following 18 games received multiple nominations:

The following four games received multiple awards:

Companies with multiple nominations and awards

The following companies received multiple nominations as either a developer or publisher:

The following companies received multiple awards as either a developer or publisher:

External links
 Archived Finalists
 Archived Winners

Notes

References

Annual Interactive Achievement Awards
Annual Interactive Achievement Awards
Annual Interactive Achievement Awards
Annual Interactive Achievement Awards
1997 in video gaming
1998 in video gaming
D.I.C.E. Award ceremonies